HMS Kirkliston (M1157) was a  of the Royal Navy, built by Harland and Wolff and launched on 18 February 1954. In a brief episode from 1956 to 1960 she was temporarily renamed HMS Kilmorey and was assigned to the Ulster division Royal Naval Reserve (RNR).

Construction and design
Kirkliston was ordered on 22 March 1952, was launched at Harland and Wolff's Belfast shipyard on 18 February 1954 and completed on 21 August 1954.

Armament consisted of a single Bofors 40 mm anti-aircraft gun forward and two Oerlikon 20 mm cannon aft. Minesweeping equipment included wire sweeps for sweeping moored contact mines and acoustic or magnetic sweeps for dealing with influence mines. The ship had a crew of 27 in peacetime and 39 in wartime.

Service
On 14 August 1956, Kirkliston served with the Ulster Division of the Royal Navy Reserve (RNR), and as such, was temporarily renamed Kilmorey, until replaced by sister-ship  in July 1960, when Kirkliston resumed her original name. From November 1962 to June 1964 she was converted to a minehunter at Portsmouth Dockyard. Her magnetic sweep gear was removed and Type 193 Sonar was fitted to allow mines to be detected so that divers could destroy the mine. She then joined the 4th Mine Countermeasures Squadron at Port Edgar. From 1966 she saw service in the Far East as part of the 6th Mine Countermeasures Squadron based at Hong Kong. On 16 August 1971, Typhoon Rose struck Hong Kong. Kirkliston and the other two minesweepers of the 6th Mine Countermeasures Squadron,  and  took part in rescue operations following the Typhoon. Kirleston rescued 40 survivors from stranded ships, including the only four survivors from the Hong Kong–Macau ferry Fat Shan, which had foundered off Lantau Island, killing 88 passengers and crew. In 1972 she returned to British waters, joining the First Mine Countermeasures Squadron, again at Port Edgar.

In 1973 Kirkliston was refitted at Gibraltar, and following the refit served for six months with the Forth Division of the RNR, being the first minehunter operated by the RNR, before joining the 2nd Mine Countermeasures Squadron based at Portsmouth. From August to December 1975 she was part of STANAVFORCHAN (Standing Naval Force Channel). In 1977 she was used to evaluate equipment planned for the s. HMS Kirkliston was decommissioned on 2 December 1985 and was sold for scrap on 20 October 1991.

References

Ton-class minesweepers of the Royal Navy
Ships built in Belfast
1954 ships
Cold War minesweepers of the United Kingdom
Ships built by Harland and Wolff